(Frederick) Geoffrey Nethersole Cloke FRS is a British chemist, and professor at University of Sussex.

Honours and awards
1988 Corday-Morgan Prize of the Royal Institute of Chemistry
1998 Tilden Prize of the Royal Institute of Chemistry
2007 Elected Fellow of the Royal Society

Publications
Owen T. Summerscales, F. Geoffrey N. Cloke, "The organometallic chemistry of pentalene", Coordination Chemistry Reviews, Volume 250, Issues 9-10, May 2006, Pages 1122-1140
Larch, CP., Cloke, FGN. & Hitchcock, PB. (2008). 'Activation and reduction of diethyl ether by low valent uranium: formation of the trimetallic, mixed valence uranium oxo species [U(CpRR')(mu-I)2]3(mu3-O) (CpRR' = C5Me5, C5Me4H, C5H4SiMe3)'. Chemical Communications, no. 1, pp. 82–84.

References

External links

http://www.iupac.org/publications/pac/authors/F.GeoffreyN.Cloke/
http://www.researchgate.net/researcher/38394723_F_Geoffrey_N_Cloke

British chemists
Fellows of the Royal Society
Academics of the University of Sussex
Living people
1953 births